HMS Templar was a British submarine of the third group of the T class. She was built by Vickers Armstrong at Barrow-in-Furness, and launched on 26 October 1942 with the pennant number P316.  So far she has been the only ship of the Royal Navy to bear the name Templar, probably after the crusading order, the Knights Templar.

Service
Templar served in the Far East for much of her wartime career, where she sank the Japanese merchant cargo ship Tyokai Maru and laid mines.  She torpedoed and damaged the Japanese light cruiser , and attacked the  but missed her with torpedoes.

She survived the war and continued in service with the Navy, finally being used as a target and sunk in Loch Striven, Scotland in 1954. She was salvaged on 4 December 1958 and arrived at Troon, Scotland on 19 July 1959 to be scrapped.

Notes

References
 
 

 

British T-class submarines of the Royal Navy
Ships built in Barrow-in-Furness
1942 ships
World War II submarines of the United Kingdom
Cold War submarines of the United Kingdom